Idehen is a surname. Notable people with the surname include:

Duncan Idehen (born 2002), English footballer
Osas Idehen (born 1990), Nigerian footballer
Faith Idehen (born 1973), Nigerian sprinter